Size is the concept of how big or small something is. It may also refer to:

 In statistics (hypothesis testing), the size of the test refers to the rate of false positives, denoted by α
 File size, in computing
 Magnitude (mathematics), magnitude or size of a mathematical object
 Magnitude of brightness or intensity of a star or an earthquake as measured on a logarithmic scale
 In mathematics there are, in addition to the dimensions mentioned above (equal if there is an isometry), various other concepts of size for sets:
measure (mathematics), a systematic way to assign to each suitable subset a number
cardinality (equal if there is a bijection), of a set is a measure of the "number of elements of the set"
for well-ordered sets: ordinal number (equal if there is an order-isomorphism)
 Resizing (fiction), a theme in fiction, in particular in fairy tales, fantasy, and science fiction
 Sizing, or size, a filler or glaze
 Size (surname)
 Clothing size, the label sizes used for garments sold off-the-shelf
 Size (band), a Mexican punk rock band

See also